Lost, Found is a 2018 Chinese drama film directed by Lü Yue and produced by Feng Xiaogang. The film stars Yao Chen, Ma Yili, Yuan Wenkang,  and Wu Haochen. It is a remake of 2016 South Korean film Missing. The film premiered at the 21st Shanghai International Film Festival on 17 June 2018, and opened in China on 5 October 2018.

Cast
 Yao Chen as Li Jie, a middle-class lawyer who has a daughter.
 Ma Yili as Sun Fang, a nanny who works in Li Jie's home, taking care of her daughter.
 Yuan Wenkang as Tian Ning, Li Jie's former husband.
 Wu Haochen as Zhang Bo
 Wang Zichen
 Gao Ye
 Qi Xiang
 Tao Xinran
 Yuan Jing
 Yu Zhenhui
 Xu Bozhan

Production
The film marks Lǚ Yue's fourth film as a director.

Release
Lost, Found premiered at the 21st Shanghai International Film Festival on 17 June 2018 with wide-release in China on 5 October 2018.

Accolades

References

External links
 
 
 

2018 films
2010s Mandarin-language films
Chinese drama films
Films directed by Lu Yue
2018 drama films